An ocarina is an ancient wind musical instrument.

Ocarina may also refer to:

 The Legend of Zelda: Ocarina of Time, a 1998 video game released for the Nintendo 64, commonly regarded as being one of the greatest games of all time
 Ocarina (app), a music-making app
 The Ocarina, a 1919 German silent film
 Ocarina Networks, a technology company
 Ocarina (Adventure Time), an episode of Adventure Time
 "The Ocarina", a song by Irving Berlin